Roseberry Park Hospital is a mental health facility in Middlesbrough, North Yorkshire, England, run by the Tees, Esk and Wear Valleys NHS Foundation Trust.

History
The hospital was procured under a Private Finance Initiative contract in 2007 to replace St Luke's Hospital, Middlesbrough. The facility, which was designed by MAAP and built by Laing O'Rourke at a cost of £75 million, opened in 2010. However, following concerns about defects in the building, some patients were moved to Sandwell Park Hospital in Hartlepool in October 2017.

References

External links
 Tees, Esk and Wear Valleys NHS Foundation Trust

Hospital buildings completed in 2011
Psychiatric hospitals in England
Hospitals in North Yorkshire
Buildings and structures in Middlesbrough